Niels Patrick Nkounkou (born 1 November 2000) is a French professional footballer who plays as a left-back for  club Saint-Étienne, on loan from Premier League club Everton. He made his international debut for the France Olympic team at Tokyo 2020.

Club career

Early career
Nkounkou started his career with Cergy Pontoise, coming through the club’s youth ranks. He signed for Ligue 1 giants Marseille in 2017. As a promising youngster, Nkounkou played regularly for Marseille’s B team, routinely training with the senior side and featuring on the bench twice for the first team during the 2019–20 season.

Everton
Nkounkou joined Everton on a free transfer in July 2020, signing a three-year deal, after rejecting a professional contract from Marseille due to the sporting plan proposed by the French club wasn’t convincing for the defender and his future development. The opportunity of working under Carlo Ancelotti convinced Nkounkou to join the Toffees. Nkounkou’s agent Yvan Le Mée stressed that Ancelotti called the player, spoke to him, and knew the player’s potential. By working with the player, Ancelotti can make him a top player.

Nkounkou made his professional debut for Everton in a 3–0 EFL Cup victory against Salford City in which he impressed immensely, forming an effective attacking partnership down the left hand side of the pitch with fellow youngster Anthony Gordon. He put in another positive display in his second match, also in the EFL Cup, against Fleetwood Town which he capped with a back-heeled assist to set up a goal for Moise Kean in a 5–2 victory.

Nkounkou played his first league game for Everton on 1 November 2020 against Newcastle United, a game Everton lost 2–1. He replaced teammate Lucas Digne who was serving a one match ban. He made his second league appearance in the last day of the season when Everton suffered a 5–0 defeat to Manchester City on 23 May 2021.

International career
Born in France, Nkounou is of Republic of Congo descent. He has represented France and has been capped twice for the country’s U19 side. In July 2021, Nkounkou received a call up to the France Olympics squad, who will face Japan, South Africa and Mexico in Group A of the tournament. He subsequently made his debut for France U23 when they played South Africa in the second tournament match on 25 July 2021.

Style of play
Upon the signing of Nkounkou, Everton Director of Football Marcel Brands said "Niels is a young, talented player with good technical and physical skills." Jeremy Smith, a French football writer and podcaster at French Football Weekly, believed that “Nkounkou is a well-regarded young left-back who can also play further up the left flank is a little like a Benjamin Mendy in that he is strong, has a great engine and can patrol the whole flank all match and has a decent shot and cross on him too.”

Career statistics

References

External links
Profile at the Everton F.C. website

2000 births
Living people
Sportspeople from Pontoise
French footballers
France youth international footballers
Association football defenders
Cergy Pontoise FC players
FC Rouen players
Entente SSG players
Stade Brestois 29 players
Olympique de Marseille players
Everton F.C. players
Standard Liège players
Cardiff City F.C. players
AS Saint-Étienne players
Championnat National 2 players
Premier League players
Belgian Pro League players

French expatriate footballers
Expatriate footballers in England
Expatriate footballers in Belgium
French expatriate sportspeople in England
French expatriate sportspeople in Belgium
Black French sportspeople
French sportspeople of Republic of the Congo descent
Olympic footballers of France
Footballers at the 2020 Summer Olympics
Footballers from Val-d'Oise